Darb is a village in Andika County, Khuzestan Province, Iran. 

Darb may refer to:

Weapons 
Darb (sword), a Thai/laos single-edge sword/martial arts weapon

Places 
Darb, Armenia
Darb, Bagh-e Malek, Iran
Darb, Izeh, Iran
Darb-e Bagh, Iran
Darb-e Juqa, Iran